This is a list of equipment used by the Venezuelan Army.

Artillery

Vehicles

Aircraft

Infantry weapons

References

Military equipment of Venezuela
Venezuela